Juma Inad (born 1956) is serving as the Minister of Defense of Iraq under al-Kadhimi's government since 2020.

References

1956 births
Living people
Defence ministers of Iraq
Iraqi generals